The 2018 Mexican Open was a professional tennis tournament played on outdoor hard courts. It was the 25th edition of the men's tournament (18th for the women), and part of the 2018 ATP World Tour and the 2018 WTA Tour. It took place in Acapulco, Mexico between 26 February and 3 March 2018, at the Princess Mundo Imperial.

Points and prize money

Point distribution

Prize money 

1 Qualifiers prize money is also the Round of 32 prize money
* per team

ATP singles main-draw entrants

Seeds

1 Rankings as of February 19, 2018.

Other entrants 
The following players received wildcards into the main draw:
  Lucas Gómez
  Thanasi Kokkinakis
  Jack Sock

The following players received entry from the qualifying draw:
  Ričardas Berankis 
  Alexander Bublik
  Ernesto Escobedo
  Cameron Norrie

The following players received entry as lucky losers:
  Taro Daniel
  Mackenzie McDonald

Withdrawals
Before the tournament
  Marin Čilić → replaced by  Donald Young
  Alexandr Dolgopolov → replaced by  Nikoloz Basilashvili
  Steve Johnson → replaced by  Mackenzie McDonald
  Nick Kyrgios → replaced by  Peter Gojowczyk
  Rafael Nadal → replaced by  Taro Daniel

Retirements
  Nikoloz Basilashvili

ATP doubles main-draw entrants

Seeds 

1 Rankings as of February 19, 2018.

Other entrants 
The following pairs received wildcards into the doubles main draw:
  Marcelo Arévalo /  Miguel Ángel Reyes-Varela 
  David Marrero /  Fernando Verdasco

The following pair received entry from the qualifying draw:
  Radu Albot /  Nikoloz Basilashvili

The following pair received entry as lucky losers:
  Max Mirnyi /  Philipp Oswald

Withdrawals 
Before the tournament
  Marcelo Melo

WTA singles main-draw entrants

Seeds

1 Rankings as of February 19, 2018.

Other entrants
The following players received wildcards into the main draw:
  Kayla Day
  Daria Gavrilova 
  Renata Zarazúa

The following players received entry from the qualifying draw:
  Jana Fett 
  Amandine Hesse 
  Jasmine Paolini
  Rebecca Peterson
  Arantxa Rus 
  Dayana Yastremska

Withdrawals
Before the tournament
  Mona Barthel → replaced by  Lara Arruabarrena
  Kirsten Flipkens → replaced by  Madison Brengle
  Kaia Kanepi → replaced by  Stefanie Vögele

Retirements
  Kateryna Kozlova
  Dayana Yastremska

WTA doubles main-draw entrants

Seeds

1 Rankings as of February 19, 2018.

Other entrants 
The following pair received a wildcard into the doubles main draw:
  Ana Sofía Sánchez /  Renata Zarazúa

The following pair received entry as alternates:
  Kristýna Plíšková /  Stefanie Vögele

Withdrawals 
Before the tournament
  Bibiane Schoofs

Champions

Men's singles

  Juan Martín del Potro def.  Kevin Anderson, 6–4, 6–4.

Women's singles

  Lesia Tsurenko def.  Stefanie Vögele, 5–7, 7–6(7–2), 6–2.

Men's doubles

  Jamie Murray /  Bruno Soares def.  Bob Bryan /  Mike Bryan, 7–6(7–4), 7–5.

Women's doubles

  Tatjana Maria /  Heather Watson def.  Kaitlyn Christian /  Sabrina Santamaria, 7–5, 2–6, [10–2].

References

External links